The Southern Intercollegiate Athletic Association was one of the earliest collegiate athletic conferences, formed in December 1894.  Though many of its earliest schools departed in the 1920s to form the Southern Conference, and later the Southeastern Conference and Atlantic Coast Conference, it existed until 1942.  Baseball competition was one of the sports sponsored from its earliest days.

Champions by year
This is an incomplete list of champions of the SIAA.

Post SoCon

Champions
Southern Intercollegiate Athletic Association